Geared to Go is a 1924 American silent action film directed by Albert S. Rogell and starring Reed Howes, Carmelita Geraghty and George Nichols.

Cast
 Reed Howes
 Carmelita Geraghty
 George Nichols
 Winifred Landis
 Joe Butterworth
 Cuyler Supplee
 Melbourne MacDowell
 George B. Williams

References

Bibliography
 Darby, William. Masters of Lens and Light: A Checklist of Major Cinematographers and Their Feature Films. Scarecrow Press, 1991.

External links
 

1924 films
1920s action films
1920s English-language films
American silent feature films
American action films
American black-and-white films
Films about taxis
Films directed by Albert S. Rogell
Rayart Pictures films
Silent action films
1920s American films